1 Samuel 21 is the twenty-first chapter of the First Book of Samuel in the Old Testament of the Christian Bible or the first part of the Books of Samuel in the Hebrew Bible. According to Jewish tradition the book was attributed to the prophet Samuel, with additions by the prophets Gad and Nathan, but modern scholars view it as a composition of a number of independent texts of various ages from c. 630–540 BCE. This chapter contains the account of David's escape from Saul's repeated attempts to kill him. This is within a section comprising 1 Samuel 16 to 2 Samuel 5 which records the rise of David as the king of Israel.

Text
This chapter was originally written in the Hebrew language. It is divided into 15 verses in English Bibles, but 16 verses in Hebrew Bible with different verse numbering.

Verse numbering
There are some differences in verse numbering of this chapter in English Bibles and Hebrew texts:

This article generally follows the common numbering in Christian English Bible versions, with notes to the numbering in Hebrew Bible versions.

Textual witnesses
Some early manuscripts containing the text of this chapter in Hebrew are of the Masoretic Text tradition, which includes the Codex Cairensis (895), Aleppo Codex (10th century), and Codex Leningradensis (1008). Fragments containing parts of this chapter in Hebrew were found among the Dead Sea Scrolls including 4Q52 (4QSam; 250 BCE) with extant verses 1–3, 5–10.

Extant ancient manuscripts of a translation into Koine Greek known as the Septuagint (originally was made in the last few centuries BCE) include Codex Vaticanus (B; B; 4th century) and Codex Alexandrinus (A; A; 5th century).

Old Testament references
: ;

New Testament references
: Matthew 12:1–8; ;

Places 

Gath
Nob
Valley of Elah

David in Nob (21:1–9)
David's visit in Nob (north of Jerusalem) is the first scene in a narrative of the priests providing support for David—not willingly like from Jonathan and Michal, but through deception—that continues with tragic consequences in 22:6–23. David's surprise visit was suspicious, but quickly allayed by a concocted story of a secret mission..  The priest at Nob, Ahimelech, the grandson of Eli, was persuaded to give provision to David and his young men from 'holy bread' or 'bread of Presence' which was only reserved for priests (Leviticus 24:9), based on David's assurances that the young men were 'ceremonially clean' — through abstention from sex and that their 'vessels' (euphemism for 'sexual organs') were clean. 
David also obtained Goliath's sword, which was 'wrapped in cloth behind the
ephod' (verse 9), a significant omen for future successes.

Verse 1
Now David came to Nob, to Ahimelech the priest. And Ahimelech was afraid when he met David, and said to him, “Why are you alone, and no one is with you?"
"Ahimelech the priest": Ahimelech was brother to that Ahiah (1 Samuel 14:3), who was apparently dead at that time, both were the priests and sons of Ahitub.

Verse 7
Now a certain man of the servants of Saul was there that day, detained before the Lord. And his name was Doeg, an Edomite, the chief of the herdsmen who belonged to Saul."
The reference to Doeg the Edomite in this verse becomes meaningful in the next part of the plot (22:9–10,18), whose presence could also be related to the long-standing animosity between Israel and Edom (Genesis 25:25, 30; Numbers 20:1–21; Judges 3:7-11). His 'detention' in the sanctuary was probably connected with an act of penance, or that he might be 'cultically unclean'.

David in Gath (21:10–15)
David planned to take refuge in Gath, but was recognized by the courtiers of Gath, who recited the words specifically connected with his successes against the Philistines, perhaps by the fact that he was carrying Goliath's sword. Being outside YHWH's territory and within reach of the Philistines (maybe because he had not consulted YHWH before fleeing to Gath), David
acted quickly to feign madness. Achish, the king of Gath, was deceived and immediately let David go..

Verse 11
And the servants of Achish said to him, “Is this not David the king of the land? Did they not sing of him to one another in dances, saying:
‘Saul has slain his thousands,
And David his ten thousands’?”
"Did they not sing": the chant cited in 1 Samuel 18:7 apparently had become a popular song.

See also

Related Bible parts: 1 Samuel 17, 1 Samuel 18, 1 Samuel 20

Notes

References

Sources

Commentaries on Samuel

General

External links
 Jewish translations:
 Shmuel I - I Samuel - Chapter 21 (Judaica Press). Hebrew text and English translation [with Rashi's commentary] at Chabad.org
 Christian translations:
 Online Bible at GospelHall.org (ESV, KJV, Darby, American Standard Version, Bible in Basic English)
 1 Samuel chapter 21. Bible Gateway

21